McFarland Peak is a limestone peak in the northern portion of the Spring Mountains in Clark County of southern Nevada. It is in the Toiyabe National Forest and the Mount Charleston Wilderness.

McFarland Peak is located north of Mount Charleston.

References

External links 
 

Spring Mountains
Mountains of Nevada
Mountains of Clark County, Nevada